In mathematics, specifically functional analysis, the barrier cone is a cone associated to any non-empty subset of a Banach space.  It is closely related to the notions of support functions and polar sets.

Definition

Let X be a Banach space and let K be a non-empty subset of X.  The barrier cone of K is the subset b(K) of X∗, the continuous dual space of X, defined by

Related notions

The function

defined for each continuous linear functional ℓ on X, is known as the support function of the set K;  thus, the barrier cone of K is precisely the set of continuous linear functionals ℓ for which σK(ℓ) is finite.

The set of continuous linear functionals ℓ for which σK(ℓ) ≤ 1 is known as the polar set of K.  The set of continuous linear functionals ℓ for which σK(ℓ) ≤ 0 is known as the (negative) polar cone of K.  Clearly, both the polar set and the negative polar cone are subsets of the barrier cone.

References

 

Functional analysis